Along the Way was a Canadian children's television anthology series which aired on CBC Television in 1974.

Premise
Each episode consisted of two-halves. The first half combined productions from the United Kingdom and Canada. The British segments were titled "Along the River and Seashore" and featured the adventures of two children with their uncle. The Canadian segments, "Along the Trail", presented the adventures of a Canadian forest ranger. The second half consisted of Canadian-produced independent short films.

One episode, "For the Love of A Horse", featured young equestrian rider Anne Lawson. It was an early career production of Mark Irwin.

Scheduling
The series aired on Tuesdays at 5:00 p.m. (Eastern) from 2 April to 25 June 1974.

References

External links
 

CBC Television original programming
1974 Canadian television series debuts
1974 Canadian television series endings